Colegio Monteverde is a Chilean school located in Santiago,.

References

External links
 , the school's official website (in Spanish)

Educational institutions with year of establishment missing
Schools in Santiago, Chile